Makan Ente Makan is a 1985 Indian Malayalam-language film, directed by J. Sasikumar and produced by Joy Thomas. The film stars Sukumari, Mammootty, Raadhika and Bahadur. The film has musical score by Johnson.

Cast
Mammootty as Prakasan
Raadhika as Sujatha
Bahadur as Sankan Nair
Sukumari as Saraswathi
Mala Aravindan as Vasudevan
Kaviyoor Ponnamma as Paaruvamma
Chitra
T. G. Ravi as Madhavan Nair
Cochin Haneefa as Doctor
Master Prasobh as Priyadarshanan
Prathapachandran as Judge
Rajan P. Dev
V. D. Rajappan as Dasappan
Beena Sabu

Soundtrack 
The music was composed by Johnson and the lyrics were written by Poovachal Khader.

References

External links
 

1985 films
1980s Malayalam-language films